This is a list of pipelines used to transport natural gas.

Africa
 Trans-Saharan gas pipeline (planned)
 West African Gas Pipeline
 Escravos–Lagos Pipeline System

Asia
 Altai gas pipeline (planned)
 Arab Gas Pipeline
 Pak Arab Pipeline Co. Ltd
 Sui Southern Pipeline Ltd
 Sui Northern Gas Pipelines Limited
 Bukhara-Tashkent-Bishkek-Almaty pipeline
 Central Asia-Center gas pipeline system
 Central Asia-China gas pipeline
 Dabhol-Bangalore Natural Gas Pipeline
 Dolphin Gas Project
 East West Gas Pipeline (India)
 HVJ Gas Pipeline
 Iran-Armenia Natural Gas Pipeline
 Iran-Pakistan-India gas pipeline (under construction)
 Tabriz–Ankara pipeline
 Korpezhe-Kurt Kui Pipeline
 Myanmar-Thailand Pipelines (3)
 Peninsular Gas Pipeline
 Sabah–Sarawak Gas Pipeline
 Shaan-Jing pipeline
 South Caucasus Pipeline (Baku-Tbilisi-Erzurum pipeline)
 Trans Thailand Malaysian Gas Pipeline
 Trans-Afghanistan Pipeline (planned)
 Trans-Caspian Gas Pipeline (planned)
 Pipeline Infrastructure Limited 
 Yadana Pipeline
 Zhongxian-Wuhan Pipeline

Europe
European gas pipelines include:

InterEuropean
 Balticconnector, bi-directional connect between Estonian and Finnish gas grids.
 Baltic Pipe, from Denmark to Poland.
 BBL Pipeline, for bi-directional transport between the Netherlands and England.
 ENAGAS Pipeline, Spanish pipeline.
 GIPL, from Poland to Lithuania.
 Interconnector (North Sea), for bi-directional transport between Bacton Gas Terminal, England and Zeebrugge, Belgium.
 Interconnector Greece-Bulgaria, for linking the Greek and Bulgarian gas networks.
 JAGAL, German section of the Yamal-Europe pipeline. 
 Langeled Pipeline, from Norway to England.
 MIDAL, German pipeline, from Bunde, Germany to South Germany, connecting to WEDAL and STEGAL.
 MEGAL, German pipeline, from Czech–German and Austrian–German borders to the German–French border.
 NEL pipeline, German pipeline, connects the Nord Stream 1 pipeline with the Rehden-Hamburg gas pipeline and MIDAL.
 National Transmission System, network throughout the UK.
 Netra, from  Emden and Dornum to eastern Germany, connecting North Sea Gas fields to JAGAL.
 OPAL pipeline, a pipeline for connecting the Nord Stream 1 to the existing pipeline grid in Middle and Western Europe.
 Rehden-Hamburg gas pipeline, German pipeline branch of MIDAL supply Hamburg.
 Scotland-Northern Ireland pipeline, from Scotland to Northern Ireland.
 STEGAL, a central German pipeline connecting the JAGAL/Yamal–Europe pipeline and MIDAL
 South Wales Gas Pipeline, from the South Hook LNG terminal to the National Transmission System.
 Trans Austria Gas Pipeline, from Slovak-Austrian border at Baumgarten an der March to the border with Italy.
 Trans Europa Naturgas Pipeline (TENP), German pipeline from the German-Netherlands border near Aachen to the German-Swiss border near Schwörstadt, connects to the Transitgas Pipeline.
 Transitgas Pipeline, in Switzerland.
 West-Austria-Gasleitung
 WEDAL, German pipeline connecting Germany to Belgium network.

Planned pipelines for intereuropean gas transport:
 Baltic Gas Interconnector, (planned). Between Germany, Denmark and Sweden.
 South German natural gas pipeline (planned - cancelled). From Burghausen on the German-Austrian border to Lampertheim.
 Skanled (planned - cancelled). Connecting Norway to Sweden and Denmark.

Supply to Europe

From Africa

All African routes run from Hassi R'Mel the Algerian hub for natural gas, it supplies gas from the Hassi R'Mel gas field. (The planned Trans-Saharan gas pipeline will connect Nigeria to Hassi R’Mel).
Pipelines from Hassi R’Mel:
 Greenstream pipeline, from Libya to Italy, part of the Western Libyan Gas Project.
 Maghreb-Europe Gas Pipeline, from Algeria; Tanger, Morocco; Tarifa, Spain.
 Medgaz, from Algeria to Almeria, Spain.
 Trans-Mediterranean Pipeline, from Algeria via Tunisia to Sicily and thence to mainland Italy.

Planned pipeline for gas transport from Africa:
 GALSI, (planned). From Algeria to Sardinia and further northern Italy.

From Azerbaijan and Middle East

Pipelines connect mainly from the Shah Deniz gas field in Azerbaijan. Connections to the Middle East are possible:
 Eastring (proposed), an alternative to the South Stream, via Bulgaria, Romania, Hungary and Slovakia, for transport from the Black Sea, Caspian Sea, and Middle East.
 Southern Gas Corridor, To supply gas also from the Caspian and Middle Eastern regions. Consists of:
 South Caucasus Pipeline, through Turkey to Erzurum. Runs parallel to the Baku–Tbilisi–Ceyhan oil pipeline.
 Trans-Anatolian gas pipeline (TANAP) through Turkey, Greece, Albania to Italy. It is connected with Trans Adriatic Pipeline.
 Trans Adriatic Pipeline, from (Azerbaijan), via Greece, Albania to Italy and further to Western Europe.
 Turkey–Greece pipeline, part of the Interconnector Turkey–Greece–Italy (ITGI)
 Greece-Italy pipeline (proposed), part of the Interconnector Turkey–Greece–Italy (ITGI)
 Qatar-Turkey pipeline (proposed).
 Trans-Caspian Gas Pipeline (proposed), eastward extension of Southern Gas Corridor to transport natural gas from Turkmenistan and Kazakhstan.
 White Stream, (proposed). Connecting the South Caucasus Pipeline, crossing the Black Sea to Constanta, Romania with further supplies to Central Europe.

A lecture was held at The Institute of World Politics to consider the economic and geopolitics of the rival pipelines and what's at stake for the concerned parties, namely TANAP and South Stream's replacement Turkish Stream.

From the North Sea gasfields
 CATS pipeline, from Central North Sea Everest gasfield to Teesside, England.
 Europipe I, from North Sea to Dornum, Germany.
 Europipe II, from Stavanger, Norway to Dornum, Germany.
 FLAGS, between North Sea gas fields.
 Franpipe, from the North Sea (mainly Sleipner gas field) to Dunkirk, France.
 Frigg UK System (FUKA), from the North Sea to St Fergus Gas Terminal, Scotland.
 Fulmar Gas Line, from the central North Sea to St Fergus Gas Terminal, Scotland.
 NOGAT Pipeline System, connects Dutch continental shelf with Den Helder, the Netherlands.
 Norpipe, from Ekofisk gasfield in the North Sea to Emden, Germany.
 SAGE
 SEAL from the Elgin-Franklin gasfield, to Bacton Gas Terminal, England.
 Statpipe, links northern North Sea gas fields with the Norway’s gas export system.
 Tyra West - F3 pipeline, pipeline connecting Danish and Dutch continental shelf pipeline systems to Den Helder.
 Vesterled, from the Heimdal gas field in the North Sea to St Fergus Gas Terminal, Scotland.
 Zeepipe, form North Sea to Zeebrugge, Belgium.

From Russia
Completed pipeline projects:
 Blue Stream, from Russia through the Black Sea to Turkey.
 Gazela Pipeline, through Czech Republic, for Russian gas to Germany.
 MEGAL, from the Czech–German and Austrian–German borders to the German–French border, for transporting Russian Gas to Germany.
 Nord Stream 1 and 2 (North European underwater Gas Pipelines), submarine pipeline from Vyborg in the Russian Federation to Greifswald, Germany.
 Bratstvo pipeline, Progress Pipeline, Soyuz Pipeline (also known in English as the Brotherhood Pipeline, the West-Siberian Pipeline and Trans-Siberian Pipeline). : runs parallel to the Urengoy–Pomary–Uzhgorod pipeline
 Yamal-Europe pipeline, from Western Siberia Russia to Germany. Runs partly parallel to the Northern Lights.
 JAGAL
 OPAL
 STORK, Czech-Polish interconnector

Proposed pipelines for gas transport from Russia:
 Nabucco Pipeline (also Turkey–Austria gas pipeline) (planned - canceled). From Erzurum, Turkey through Bulgaria, Romania, Hungary to Baumgarten an der March in Austria. 
 South Stream, (planned - canceled). From Russia, through the Black Sea, Bulgaria, Serbia to Italy.

North America

Interstate pipelines are regulated by the National Energy Board in Canada and the Federal Energy Regulatory Commission (FERC) in the US. Intrastate pipelines are regulated by state, provincial or local jurisdictions.

Canada

 Alliance Pipeline Limited Partnership
 Brunswick Pipeline (Emera Incorporated)
 Foothills Pipeline Ltd. (see TC PipeLines)
Many Islands Pipe Lines (Canada) Ltd. (see TransGas)
 Maritimes & Northeast Pipeline 
 TransCanada PipeLines, LP (TC PipeLines)
 TransGas
 TransQuebec & Maritimes Pipeline (see Gaz Métro & TC PipeLines)
 Sable Offshore Energy Inc. (SOEI)
 WestCoast Energy Inc.

Mexico

 Activo de Burgos - Pipeline Network
 Burgos-Monterrey Pipeline
 Cadereyta Pipeline
 San Fernando Pipeline
 Tamazunchale Pipeline
 Los Ramones Pipeline
 Agua Prieta pipeline

Puerto Rico
 Vía Verde Pipeline

United States interstate pipelines
FERC requires most interstate pipelines to maintain an interactive web site with standardized information regarding their operations under a heading of "Informational Postings." The exact legal name of each company appears below.  Many of these companies are wholly owned subsidiaries of larger publicly traded companies.

Major interstate pipelines

 Alaskan Natural Gas Pipeline (planned)
 Algonquin Gas Transmission
 Alliance Pipeline
 ANR Pipeline Company — formerly Michican Wisconsin
 Atlantic Coast Pipeline (planned)
 Bluegrass Pipeline (proposed)
 CenterPoint Energy Gas Transmission Company 
 Centerpoint Energy - Mississippi River — formerly, Mississippi River Transmission
 Colorado Interstate Gas Company 
 Columbia Gas Transmission Corporation 
 Columbia Gulf Transmission Company 
 Devon Energy
 Dominion Transmission, Inc.  (formerly Consolidated Gas Transmission)
 East Tennessee Pipeline 
 El Paso Exploration & Production
 El Paso Natural Gas Company 
 Enbridge
 Florida Gas Transmission Company
 Gas Transmission Northwest Corporation  — formerly Pacific Gas Transmission
 Great Lakes Transmission 
 Gulf South Pipeline — formerly, United Gas Pipeline Company 
 Kern River Pipeline
 Natural Gas Pipeline Company Of America 
 Kinder Morgan Interstate Gas Transmission LLC — owned by Kinder Morgan Energy Partners, formerly Kansas Nebraska and KN Energy
 Magellan Midstream Partners
 Maritimes and Northeast Pipeline  
 Midwestern Gas Transmission Company 
 Mountain Valley Pipeline LLC 
 National Fuel Gas Supply Corporation 
 Northern Border Pipeline Company 
 Northern Natural Pipeline 
 Northwest Pipeline Corporation 
 Panhandle Eastern Pipe Line Company, LP 
 Portland Natural Gas Transmission System
 Questar Pipeline Company
 Rockies Express Pipeline  
 Ruby Pipeline
 Sabal Trail Transmission Pipeline
 Southern Trails Pipeline 
 Southern Natural Gas Company 
 Southern Star Central Gas Pipeline, Inc  
 Suncor Energy
 Tennessee Gas Pipeline Company 
 Texas Eastern Transmission Pipeline
 Texas Gas Pipe Line Corporation 
 Texas Gas Transmission, LLC 
 Texas-Ohio Pipeline
 Trailblazer Pipeline Company 
 Transcontinental Pipeline 
 Transwestern Pipeline Company, LLC 
 Trunkline Pipeline 
 Viking Gas Transmission Company
 Williston Basin Pipeline
 Williams Companies

Minor interstate pipelines
 ANR Storage Company 
 Arkansas Western Pipeline, L. L. C 
 Black Marlin Pipeline Company 
 Blue Dolphin Pipe Line Company 
 Blue Lake Gas Storage Company 
 Boundary Gas, Incorporated 
 B-R Pipeline Company 
 Canyon Creek Compression Company 
 Caprock Pipeline Company 
 Carolina Gas Transmission, a SCANA Company (formerly SCG Pipeline Inc./South Carolina Pipeline Corp)
 Central Kentucky Transmission Company 
 Central New York Oil And Gas Company, LLC 
 Chandeleur Pipe Line Company 
 Cheyenne Plains Gas Pipeline Company, L.L.C.
 Cotton Valley Compression LLC 
 Clear Creek Storage Company, LLC 
 Crossroads Pipeline Company
 Discovery Gas Transmission LLC 
 Dauphin Island Gathering Partners 
 Destin Pipeline Company, L.L.C. 
 Distrigas Corporation 
 Dominion South Pipeline Co., LP 
 Eastern Shore Natural Gas Company (incl. Eastern Shore Pipeline)
 Egan Hub Storage, LLC (d/b/a Spectra Energy)
 EMKEY Gathering LLC
 Enbridge Pipelines (Alatenn) L.L.C. (formerly, Alabama-Tennessee)
 Enbridge Pipelines (Midla) L.L.C. (formerly, Mid-Louisiana)
 Enbridge Pipelines (Kpc) 
 Equitrans, L. P. 
 Energy West Development, Inc. 
 Freebird Gas Storage, L.L.C. 
 Garden Banks Gas Pipeline, LLC 
 Gas Gathering Corporation 
 Gasdel Pipeline System, Inc. 
 Gulf States Transmission Corporation 
 Great Lakes Gas Transport, L.L.C. 
 Guardian Pipeline, L.L.C. 
 Granite State Gas Transmission, Inc. 
 Honeoye Storage Corporation 
 Horizon Pipeline Company, L.L.C. 
 Iroquois Gas Transmission System, L.P. 
 The Inland Gas Company 
 Centra Pipelines Minnesota Inc. 
 Jupiter Energy Corporation 
 KO Transmission Company 
 Kentucky West Virginia Gas Company 
 Louisiana-Nevada Transit Company
 Mariposa Ranch Gas Pipeline Falfurrias
 Markwest New Mexico L.P. (Pinnacle) 
 Millennium Pipeline Company, L.P. 
 MIGC, Inc. 
 Michigan Consolidated Gas Company 
 Michigan Gas Storage Company 
 Midwest Gas Storage, Inc. 
 Mississippi Canyon Gas Pipeline, LLC  
 Missouri Interstate Gas, LLC 
 Mobile Bay Pipeline Company 
 Mojave Pipeline Company 
 Ngo Transmission, Inc. 
 Nora Transmission Company 
 Norteño Pipeline Company 
 North Baja Pipeline, LLC 
 North Penn Gas Company 
 Oktex Pipeline Company 
 Overthrust Pipeline Company 
 Ozark Gas Transmission, L. L. C. 
 Penn-York Energy Corporation 
 Gas Transmission Northwest Corp. 
 Pacific Interstate Transmission Company 
 Paiute Pipeline Company 
 Petal Gas Storage, L. L. C. 
 Pine Needle LNG Company, LLC (peak shaving storage — not an import terminal)
 Puget Sound Energy, Inc.
 Revolution Pipeline 
 Richfield Gas Storage System 
 Riverside Pipeline Company, L. P. 
 Sabine Pipe Line Company LLC 
 Saltville Gas Storage Company L.L.C. 
 Sea Robin Pipeline Company, LLC 
 Southwest Gas Storage Company 
 Steuben Gas Storage Company 
 T C P Gathering Co. 
 Total Peaking Services, L. L. C. 
 Tuscarora Gas Transmission Company 
 Trans-Union Interstate Pipeline, L.P. 
 TransColorado Gas Transmission Company 
 Vector Pipeline L.P. 
 Venice Gathering System, L. L. C. 
 Washington Natural Gas Company 
 West Texas Gas, Inc. 
 Western Gas Interstate Company 
 Western Transmission Corporation
 Westgas Interstate, Inc.  
 Young Gas Storage Company, Ltd. 
 Wyoming Interstate Company, Ltd. 
 Portland General Electric Company 
 Nornew Energy Supply, Inc. 
 Phillips Gas Pipeline Company 
 U S G Pipeline Company

Predominantly offshore pipelines
  Black Marlin Pipeline Co.
  Chandeleur Pipeline Co.
 Destin Pipeline Co., LLC
  Dauphin Island Gathering Partners
  Discovery Gas Transmission LLC
  Enbridge Pipelines (UTOS) LLC
  Garden Banks Gas Pipeline, LLC
 Gulfstream Natural Gas System, L.L.C. 
 High Island Offshore System, LLC 
  Mississippi Gas Canyon Pipeline, LLC
  Nautilus Pipeline Co., LLC
  Panther Interstate Pipeline Energy, LLC
 Pacific Interstate Offshore Company 
 Pacific Offshore Pipeline Company 
 Sea Robin Pipeline Co.
 Shell Offshore, Inc.
  Stingray Pipeline Co., LLC
  Venice Gathering System, LLC

LNG import/export terminals

 Kenai, AK (Conoco Phillips, Kenai LNG)
 Everett, MA (GDF Suez, Distrigas of Massachusetts LLC) 
 Cove Point, MD (Dominion, Cove Point LNG)
 Elba Island, GA (El Paso, Southern LNG Inc.) 
 Lake Charles, LA (Southern Union Company, Trunkline LNG Company, LLC)
 Pascagoula, MS (El Paso Gulf LNG)
 Freeport, TX  (Freeport LNG)
 Sabine, LA (Cheniere, Sabine Pass LNG)
 Sabine Pass, TX (Golden Pass LNG)
 Cameron, LA (Sempra, Cameron LNG)
 Penuelas, PR (EcoElectrica)
 Offshore in Gulf of Mexico (Gulf Gateway Deepwater Port)
 Offshore from Gloucester, MA, (Northeast Gateway Deepwater Port)
 Offshore from Gloucester, MA (Neptune LNG)

Hinshaw pipelines
Although these pipelines flow gas in interstate commerce, they are subject to state regulation.
 Atlanta Gas Light Company
 Cobra Pipeline Company, Ltd 
 East Ohio Gas Company
 Empire State Pipeline
 Michigan Consolidated Gas Company 
 Nornew Energy Supply, Inc 
 Northern Illinois Gas Company (Nicor Gas)
 Pacific Gas and Electric Company
 Recope Pipelines - Costa Rica
 Trans-Caribbean pipeline - (planned)
 Trans-Isthmian Pipeline - Panama

South America
 Camisea Pipeline - Peru
 Cruz del Sur pipeline
 ECOPETROL Pipelines - Colombia
 NorAndino pipeline - Chile
 Gas Atacama Pipeline - Argentina
 Gas Andes Pipeline - Argentina 
 Gas Pacífico Pipeline - Argentina
 Gasbol Pipeline - Brazil
 Gasoriente Pipeline - Colombia
 OCP Pipeline - Ecuador* GASENE
 GASUN
 Gran Gasoducto del Sur (Canceled)
 Paraná-Uruguaiana pipeline - Argentina/Brazil
 SOTE Pipeline - Ecuador
 TGN Pipeline Network - Argentina
 TGI Pipeline Network - Colombia
 TGS Pipeline Network - Argentina
 Trans-Caribbean pipeline - (planned)
 Urucu-Manaus pipeline - Brazil
 Yabog pipeline

Oceania

 Amadeus Gas Pipeline, delivers gas from fields near Alice Springs to Darwin, also carries offshore supplies south
 Bayu-Undan to Darwin Pipeline, transmits gas from the Bayu-Undan facility to the Darwin LNG plant
 Carpentaria Gas Pipeline supplies Mount Isa from the east coast grid
 Dampier to Bunbury Natural Gas Pipeline
 Eastern Gas Pipeline, natural gas from Longford, Victoria to Horsely Park, Sydney
 Goldfields Gas Pipeline, Carnarvon Basin to Kalgoorlie
 Moomba Adelaide Pipeline System supplies gas from Moomba to Adelaide
 Moomba to Sydney Pipeline, parallel natural gas and ethane pipelines
 Northern Gas Pipeline, connects the Amadeus pipeline at Tennant Creek to the Carpentaria pipeline at Mount Isa
 Riverland Pipeline supplies the South Australian Riverland
 Roma to Brisbane Pipeline
 SEAGas pipeline, Otway Basin to Adelaide
 South West Queensland Pipeline (SWQP), bidirectional pipeline in southern Queensland
 Surat Basin to Gladstone Port (Natural Gas) -planned

See also
 Cleveland East Ohio Gas Explosion
 List of natural gas pipelines in Western Australia
 Natural gas pipeline system in United States
 Pipeline accidents
 Pipeline transport
 Plains All American Pipeline - U.S. oil pipeline transmission and storage business
 Texas Eastern Transmission Corporation Natural Gas Pipeline Explosion and Fire
 List of oil refineries
 List of oil pipelines

References

External links
 Global Fossil Infrastructure Tracker

 
Energy-related lists